Alicia, officially the Municipality of Alicia (Chavacano: Municipalidad de Alicia), is a 3rd class municipality in the province of Zamboanga Sibugay, Philippines. According to the 2020 census, it has a population of 39,456 people.. Alicia is the gateway to Olutanga Island via Guicam Port in Brgy. Guicam where the Guicam Bridge will soon rise.

Geography

Barangays
Alicia is politically subdivided into 27 barangays.

Climate

Demographics

Economy

References

External links
 Alicia Profile at PhilAtlas.com
 [ Philippine Standard Geographic Code]
Philippine Census Information
Alicia Official Website

Municipalities of Zamboanga Sibugay